Lophothripa vitea is a moth of the family Nolidae first described by Swinhoe in 1885. It is found in Indo-Australian tropics towards the Solomon Islands.

Description
Basal half of forewings blackish with grayish patches in other areas. There are ridges of raised scales. Postmedial line is double and blackish. Caterpillar grass green and cylindrical and smooth having only primary setae. Head bright green and round. Pupation occurs in a semiovoid cocoon made on the underside of the leaf. Pupa slender and spindle shaped without a cremaster.

Larval host plants are Terminalia, Lagerstroemia, Sonneratia and Heritiera species.

References

External links
Images
A note on the entomofauna of mangrove associates in the Andaman Islands

Moths of Asia
Moths described in 1883
Nolidae